Cahaya Jauhar (Cahaya Jauhar Sdn Bhd) is a Government Linked Company in Johor, Malaysia. It is a special vehicle joint venture company between the State of Johor under state-owned Johor State Secretary Incorporation (JSSI) and the Malaysia Federal Government under government linked company, UEM Land Berhad (Master Developer of Iskandar Puteri) to develop the new Johor State's administrative centre, which later known as Kota Iskandar and other government institutional building in Iskandar Puteri.

List of developments

Kota Iskandar

 Sultan Ismail Building (Johor's Parliament)
 Kota Iskandar Mosque
 Dato Jaafar Muhammad Building (Menteri Besar and State Secretary Complex)
 Dato Abdul Rahmand Andak Building
 Dato Mohammad Salleh Perang Building
 Dato Mohammad Ibrahim Munsyi Building
 Jauhar Child Care Centre

Landscape
 Kota Iskandar Mahkota Square
 Qiblat Axis
 Firdaus Garden
 Carmen Garden

Others
 Iskandar Puteri Fire and Rescue Station
 BPUNJ Office Complex
 Johor Pavilion

Publications
 In 2009, Cahaya Jauhar published a 228-page book titled The Making of Kota Iskandar: Johor State New Administrative Centre : Johor in the 21st Century authored by Premilla Mohanlall and Majella Gomes.

Awards and achievements
 Malaysia Landscape Architecture Award 2018
 FIABCI Malaysia Property Award 2017
 The Iskandar Malaysia Accolades Award 2016/2017
 Malaysia Landscape Architecture Award 2012
 Singapore Design Award 2012
 Johor Tourism Award 2012
 Tourism Award 2012
 Malaysia Landscape Architecture Award 2011 
 The Majestic Five Continents Award 2011 for Quality and Excellence, Rome, Italy
 FIABCI World Prix d’Excellence Award 2011 Public Iinfrastructure / Amenities, Paphos, Cyprus 
 23rd International Construction Award 2011 New Millennium Award, Paris, France
 FIABCI Malaysia Property Award 2010
 Best State Pavilion Award 2008
 Planning Excellence Award 2007

See also
Kota Iskandar
Iskandar Puteri
UEM Land Berhad

References 

Malaysian companies established in 2006
Johor
Government-owned companies of Malaysia